Bingguo is a traditional dessert dish of Beijing cuisine. The main ingredients of this dish include lotus root, almonds, walnuts, lotus seed, sugar and lotus leaf. The lotus root, lotus seeds, almonds and walnuts are chopped into small pieces and steamed. The sugar is mixed with water and then boiled to become syrup. The lotus leaf is cut into small pieces and soaked in boiling water. The steamed ingredients are placed on the lotus leaf with syrup poured on top and then cooled by ice (or nowadays in a refrigerator) and served cold. As the dessert is served in a bowl, the dish is also called bingwan (冰碗, lit. "ice bowl").

Beijing cuisine